Georges Richard Soultrait also known as Count de Soultrait, was a French writer and historian born June 27, 1822 in Toury-Lurcy, in the department of Nièvre and died September 18, 1888 in the same village.

Family
A member of the Soultrait family, he was born in 1822 in Toury in the family castle and was the son of Gaspard-Antoine-Samuel Richard of Soultrait, Roman count "in a personal capacity" by pontifical brief of September 28, 1855 (born on June 3, 1793 in Nevers, and died in 1858), second lieutenant of the young Guard imperial, then captain in 1814, officer of the Legion of Honor, medalist of St. Helena, commander of the pontifical order of St. Gregory the Great, and Hyacinthe-Esther Outrequin de Saint-Léger (1792-1878)).

He married on September 10, 1850 in Paris, Desiree Jeans (1825-1888) and they had 7 children.

Career
He was first attached to the Ministry of Finance and then collector-collector in Lyon in 1863, the city where he resided until 1876, successively occupying the functions of President of the Savings Bank, administrator of the general dispensary and Member of the Board of Directors of the Hospices Civils. He then served as treasurer-general of Haute-Marne and Doubs.

Very early, he also has political responsibilities since he became Mayor of Toury at the age of 26 and, shortly thereafter, member of the General Council of Nièvre.

He was one of the founders of the Nivernese Society of Arts, Sciences and Arts (1851). Succeeding Monseigneur Crosnier and Louis Roubet, he became its president in 1886 until his death in 1888 at his château de Toury.

Many of his publications (see the list below) are, even today, so many must-sees for Nivernais researchers, such as his Topographic Dictionary of the Department of Nièvre (1862).

In 1862, on the proposal of the Committee on Historical and Scientific Works, he received the Legion of Honor.

He received a title of Roman count by pontifical brief of Pope Pius IX of August 2, 1850.

A street in Nevers bears his name.

Publications
 Dictionnaire topographique du département de la Nièvre, 1865 (lire en ligne [archive])
 Armorial historique et archéologique du Nivernais
 Abrégé de la statistique monumentale de l'arrondissement de Nevers, 1851
 Rapport archéologique sur les cantons de Moulins (Ouest) et de Chevagnes (Allier), 1852
 Notice sur les stalles de l'église Notre-Dame de Bourg (Ain), 1852
 Considérations archéologiques sur les églises de Lyon, 1852
 Rapport archéologique sur l'église de Cuiseaux (S. et L.), 1852
 Armorial du Bourbonnais, 1857
 Abrégé de la statistique archéologique de l'arrondissement de Moulins, 1860
 Notice sur les jetons de plomb des archevêques de Lyon, 1869
 Inventaire des titres de Nevers de l'abbé de Marolles, 1873
 Répertoire archéologique du département de la Nièvre, Paris, 1875
 Notice sur les manuscrits du trésor de l'église métropolitaine de Lyon, Revue lyonnaise, 1883
 Le Château de La Bastie d'Urfé et ses seigneurs, 1886

References

People from Nièvre
19th-century French historians
1822 births
1888 deaths